Kamil Lech (born 15 September 1994) is a Polish professional footballer who plays as a goalkeeper.

References

External links
 
 

Polish footballers
1994 births
Living people
Sportspeople from Chorzów
Association football goalkeepers
Ruch Chorzów players
Podbeskidzie Bielsko-Biała players
Kotwica Kołobrzeg footballers
Ekstraklasa players
II liga players
III liga players